Please Come In is the second single by the American southern rock band Black Stone Cherry from their second studio album Folklore And Superstition. The song peaked at #24 on the Mainstream Rock Tracks Billboard chart.

Music video
A Fillmoresque concert poster so enticing that a passerby gets literally drawn into its pseudo-psychedelic artistic work for a mystica, animated adventure. Even though it's clearly the girl depicted in the posted bill and not the band itself that grabs his attention, he does make his way to an actual Black Stone Cherry show where he finally catches up with the babe. The video directed by Adam Grabarnick.

Personnel
Chris Robertson - lead vocals, rhythm guitar
Ben Wells - lead guitar, backing vocals
Jon Lawhon - bass guitar, backing vocals
John Fred Young - drums, percussion, backing vocals

External links
Black Stone Cherry's Official Website
Roadrunner Records
Black Stone Cherry's Myspace
Black Stone Cherry's Official Forum
NME Audio Player

Black Stone Cherry songs
2008 singles
2008 songs
Roadrunner Records singles
Song recordings produced by Bob Marlette
Songs written by Bob Marlette